Edward George Van Bibber (1909 – August 3, 1982) was an American football player, coach, and university professor. He served as the head football coach at Central Michigan University from 1931 to 1933 and at the University of Buffalo from 1934 to 1935, compiling a career college football record of 16–19–3. Van Bibber joined the faculty of the University of Connecticut in 1936 and was the director of the School of Physical Education there before retiring in 1969. He died on August 3, 1982 at the age of 73 after suffering a heart attack.

In 1936, Van Bibber coached the first full season of wrestling at the University at Buffalo, finishing with a record of 0–6.

Van Bibber was an alumnus of Purdue University, lettering in baseball and football.  He was a member of the 1930 Big Ten Conference champion football team and was awarded the 1931 Big Ten Medal of Honor; other notable recipients include: John Wooden, Hank Stram, Bob Griese, Mike Phipps and Jim Everett.

Head coaching record

References

1909 births
1982 deaths
20th-century American academics
American football tackles
Buffalo Bulls athletic directors
Buffalo Bulls football coaches
Central Michigan Chippewas football coaches
UConn Huskies athletic directors
Purdue Boilermakers baseball players
Purdue Boilermakers football players
University of Connecticut faculty